Aleksei Vladimirovich Katulsky (born 16 August 1977) is a former Russian professional footballer.

Club career
He made his debut in the Russian Premier League in 2000 for FC Zenit St. Petersburg.

Honours
 Top-33 year-end best players list: 2000, 2001.
 Russian Premier League runner-up: 2003.
 Russian Premier League bronze: 2001.
 Russian Cup: 1999.
 Russian Premier League Cup: 2003

European club competitions
 UEFA Intertoto Cup 2000 with FC Zenit St. Petersburg: 8 games.
 UEFA Cup 2004–05 with FC Zenit St. Petersburg: 1 game.

References

1977 births
Footballers from Saint Petersburg
Living people
Russian footballers
Association football defenders
FC Zenit Saint Petersburg players
FC Ural Yekaterinburg players
Russian Premier League players
FC Shinnik Yaroslavl players
FC Volga Nizhny Novgorod players
FC Zenit-2 Saint Petersburg players